Kim Jaewon (born 18 February 1981) is a South Korean actor. He is best known for the television dramas Romance (2002), Listen to My Heart (2011), May Queen (2012), and The Scandal (2013).

Career
Kim Jaewon made his acting debut in 2001 in the sitcom Honey Honey. He rose to stardom a year later when he played a high school senior who falls for his teacher (played by Kim Ha-neul) in 2002 hit drama Romance. Rival (with So Yoo-jin) and My Love Patzzi (with Jang Na-ra and Kim Rae-won) further raised his profile.

He reunited with Rival costar Kim Min-jung in Land of Wine (2003), where they played a young couple trying to revive traditional liquor amidst a family feud. Then in 2004, he starred opposite Sun Feifei in Beijing My Love, a South Korean-Chinese co-production which was shot 80% in China. He also appeared in the romantic comedy film 100 Days with Mr. Arrogant, followed by a supporting role in My 19 Year Old Sister-in-Law.

In Wonderful Life (2005), Kim's character deals with the consequences of a one-night stand in Singapore that leads to young marriage (to Eugene) and fatherhood. After playing a third-rate gangster who inherits a kindergarten and falls for a teacher (played by Han Ji-min) in Great Inheritance (2006), Kim was cast in his first period drama role as a nobleman romantically involved with a gisaeng in Hwang Jini (previous Mr. Arrogant costar Ha Ji-won played the title role). With his Korean Wave appeal, Kim then filmed the Chinese television drama First Love, which aired on CCTV in 2008.

Kim enlisted on March 23, 2009 to fulfill his mandatory military service, and was assigned to the Defense Media Agency. He was discharged on January 24, 2011.

As his acting comeback, Kim joined the cast of Listen to My Heart, for which he received praise for his portrayal of a deaf man. He and costar Hwang Jung-eum were later given recognition at the year-end MBC Drama Awards.

In fall 2011, Kim signed on to star in Me Too, Flower! opposite Lee Ji-ah. But on the first day of filming on October 4, he was injured when the moped he was riding malfunctioned and accidentally accelerated. After being diagnosed with a dislocated shoulder, bone fracture and torn ligaments and cartilage, he withdrew from the drama and was replaced by Yoon Shi-yoon. Kim cancelled all entertainment activities for ten months and underwent rehabilitation under Dr. Na Young-mu (well known as the doctor of figure skater Yuna Kim), eventually making a full recovery.

In 2012, Kim returned to the small screen opposite Han Ji-hye in May Queen, which depicts the success stories of people in the shipbuilding industry. He later won the Top Excellence Award in a Serial Drama at the MBC Drama Awards (he also hosted the ceremony). Kim was also the MC of Get It Beauty HOMME, a "beauty guide for men" on cable channel OnStyle.

Though he initially became popular due to his fair skin and beaming smile (which earned the actor the somewhat feminine nickname of "smiling angel" among fans), in recent years Kim has cultivated an image as a tough guy. This physicality was showcased in his next drama, The Scandal (2013), where he played a detective who discovers that the man he considers his father had kidnapped him as a child from his biological family.

In 2014, Kim joined Four Sons and One Daughter, a reality show with four male celebrities and one female guest star who form a family while living with fake parents in the countryside. He also began hosting the current affairs program The Real Story Eye, which reconstructs cases to uncover the facts beneath rumors and speculation. Later that year, he signed with a new talent agency, Will Entertainment.

Kim returned to period dramas in 2015 with Splendid Politics, playing a villainous King Injo.

In "God's Quiz: Reboot", he played the role of a lunatic Hyeon Sang-pil, continuing a diverse and wide acting transformation.

In 2020, he established a one-man entertainment agency with his manager, who he has been working with for 20 years. The company is based on trust and people.

Personal life
Kim married Park Seo-yeon (who was three months pregnant at the time) on June 28, 2013 at Raum Wedding Hall in Yeoksam-dong, Seoul. The couple were childhood friends who began dating in October 2012. Park is the daughter of the head of an advertising agency, and she works in management at a modeling agency. Their son Yi-jun, nicknamed "Heaven," was born in December 2013. Yi-jun appeared on camera for the first time when his father made a guest appearance on Stars' Top Recipe at Fun-Staurant.

Filmography

Television series

Films

Variety show

Music video appearances

Discography

Single albums

Collaborations

Awards and nominations

References

External links
  
 
 

South Korean male film actors
South Korean male television actors
1981 births
Living people
Hanyang University alumni